This Night's Foul Work is a crime-novel by French author Fred Vargas, an entry in her Commissaire Adamsberg series. The novel is translated into English by Sian Reynolds, translator of Vargas' two previous novels in English, both of which won the Duncan Lawrie International Dagger for best-translated crime novel of the year.

This Night's Foul Work marks the first time Random House have published one of her novels in hardcover. The title comes from a line of impromptu verse spoken by one of the characters.

2006 French novels
Novels by Fred Vargas
French mystery novels